The following is a list of awards and nominations received by television host, comedian, writer, and producer Conan O'Brien. He has served as a writer for Saturday Night Live (1987-1991), The Simpsons (1991-1993), before embarking on late night television with his own shows, Late Night with Conan O'Brien (1993-2009), The Tonight Show with Conan O'Brien (2009-2010), and Conan (2010-2021).

O'Brien has received various awards including 28 Primetime Emmy Award nominations including four wins for his work on Saturday Night Live, Late Night with Conan O'Brien, Conan and Conan Without Borders. He also received six Writers Guild of America Awards for Late Night with Conan O'Brien.

Major associations

Primetime Emmy Awards

Writers Guild of America Awards

Miscellaneous awards

American Comedy Awards

CableAce Awards

Critics' Choice Awards

GLAAD Media Awards

iHeartRadio Podcast Awards

People's Choice Awards

Teen Choice Awards

References

External links
 

Lists of awards received by American actor
Lists of awards received by writer
awards and nominations